Wangcun is a former town in the eastern jurisdiction of Jimo City in eastern Shandong province, China, located about  east-northeast of downtown Jimo.

See also 
 List of township-level divisions of Shandong

References 

Township-level divisions of Shandong